Boris Emmanuilovich Khaikin (– 10 May 1978) was a Soviet and Russian conductor who was named a People's Artist of the USSR in 1972.

Biography 
Khaikin was born in Minsk, then part of the Russian Empire. He studied at the Moscow Conservatory under Nicolai Malko and Konstantin Saradzhev. He was artistic director of the Little Leningrad Opera Theatre in 1936-43 and the principal conductor at the Kirov Theatre in 1944-53, where he conducted the première of Sergei Prokofiev's Betrothal in a Monastery on 3 November 1946. He moved to the Bolshoi Theatre in 1954.

He died in Moscow, and was buried in the Donskoye Cemetery.

Discography
Khaikin is noted for his two critically acclaimed recordings of Khovanshchina: a 1946 edition with Mark Reizen, and a 1972 version with Irina Arkhipova. His record of Nikolai Rimsky-Korsakov's little known early first symphony received good notices. Khaikin also recorded several operas and ballets by Pyotr Ilyich Tchaikovsky, notably a Eugene Onegin with Galina Vishnevskaya and Sergei Lemeshev.

Other opera recordings include: 
Mikhail Glinka; A Life for the Tsar (in the Ivan Susanin version), 1960.
Alexander Dargomyzhsky; Stone Guest with the USSR Radio Chorus and Symphony, 1959.
Anton Rubinstein; The Demon.
Kirill Molchanov; The Unknown Soldier.
Näcip Cihanov; Musa Dzhalil (opera-poem based on the life of Soviet Tatar poet Musa Cälil)
 Vlasov and Fere; The Witch (based on the story by Chekhov).

Footnotes

References
Bolshoi Theatre: Biography of Boris Khaykin, in Russian. URL last accessed 31 August 2018.

External links
 Retrieved on July 19, 2006.
N.N.: . Archived URL last accessed July 19, 2006.
Naxos biography

1904 births
1978 deaths
20th-century Russian conductors (music)
20th-century Russian male musicians
Musicians from Minsk
Academic staff of Moscow Conservatory
Academic staff of Saint Petersburg Conservatory
Moscow Conservatory alumni
Honored Artists of the RSFSR
People's Artists of the RSFSR
People's Artists of the USSR
Stalin Prize winners
Recipients of the Order of the Red Banner of Labour
Ballet conductors
Music directors (opera)
Jewish classical musicians
Russian male conductors (music)

Russian music educators
Soviet conductors (music)
Soviet music educators
Burials at Donskoye Cemetery